Jumnos ruckeri is a species of beetles belonging to the family Scarabaeidae.

Description

Head is steel blue. Thorax and elytra are of a deep shining green, with two large white or orange spots near the apex of the scutellum and two broad white or orange fasciae near the apex. Legs are long and green. Wings are black. This species has an evident sexual dimorphism, as males have more elongated frontal tarsale than females.

Distribution
This species can be found in Thailand.

References 
 Biolib
 W. W. Saunders   Description of six new East Indian Coleoptera. 
 Flower Beetles

Cetoniinae
Beetles described in 1839
Taxa named by William Wilson Saunders